Eichmann in Jerusalem: A Report on the Banality of Evil is a 1963 book by political thinker Hannah Arendt. Arendt, a Jew who fled Germany during Adolf Hitler's rise to power, reported on the trial of Adolf Eichmann, one of the major organizers of the Holocaust, for The New Yorker. A revised and enlarged edition was published in 1964.

Theme 
Arendt's subtitle famously introduced the phrase "the banality of evil". In part the phrase refers to Eichmann's deportment at the trial as the man displayed neither guilt for his actions nor hatred for those trying him, claiming he bore no responsibility because he was simply "doing his job" ("He did his ‘duty'...; he not only obeyed 'orders', he also obeyed the 'law'."p. 135).

Eichmann 
Arendt takes Eichmann's court testimony and the historical evidence available, and she makes several observations about Eichmann:
 Eichmann stated himself in court that he had always tried to abide by Immanuel Kant's categorical imperative (as discussed directly on pp. 135–137). She argues that Eichmann had essentially taken the wrong lesson from Kant: Eichmann had not recognized the "golden rule" and principle of reciprocity implicit in the categorical imperative, but had understood only the concept of one man's actions coinciding with general law.  Eichmann attempted to follow the spirit of the laws he carried out, as if the legislator himself would approve. In Kant's formulation of the categorical imperative, the legislator is the moral self, and all people are legislators; in Eichmann's formulation, the legislator was Hitler.  Eichmann claimed this changed when he was charged with carrying out the Final Solution, at which point Arendt claims "he had ceased to live according to Kantian principles, that he had known it, and that he had consoled himself with the thoughts that he no longer 'was master of his own deeds,' that he was unable 'to change anything'" (p. 136).
 Eichmann's inability to think for himself was exemplified by his consistent use of "stock phrases and self-invented clichés". The man demonstrated his unrealistic worldview and crippling lack of communication skills through reliance on "officialese" (Amtssprache) and the euphemistic Sprachregelung (convention of speech) that made implementation of Hitler's policies "somehow palatable."
 While Eichmann might have had anti-Semitic leanings, Arendt argued that he showed "no case of insane hatred of Jews, of fanatical anti-Semitism or indoctrination of any kind. He personally never had anything whatever against Jews” (p. 26).
 Eichmann was a "joiner" his entire life, in that he constantly joined organizations in order to define himself, and had difficulties thinking for himself without doing so. As a youth, he belonged to the YMCA, the Wandervogel, and the Jungfrontkämpferverband. In 1933, he failed in his attempt to join the Schlaraffia (a men's organization similar to Freemasonry), at which point a family friend (and future war criminal) Ernst Kaltenbrunner encouraged him to join the SS. At the end of World War II, Eichmann found himself depressed because "it then dawned on him that thenceforward he would have to live without being a member of something or other" (pp. 32–3). Arendt pointed out that his actions were not driven by malice, but rather blind dedication to the regime and his need to belong, to be a joiner. In his own words: "I sensed I would have to live a leaderless and difficult individual life, I would receive no directives from anybody, no orders and commands would any longer be issued to me, no pertinent ordinances would be there to consult—in brief, a life never known before lay ahead of me."
 Despite his claims, Eichmann was not, in fact, very intelligent. As Arendt details in the book's second chapter, he was unable to complete either high school or vocational training, and only found his first significant job (traveling salesman for the Vacuum Oil Company) through family connections. Arendt noted that, during both his SS career and Jerusalem trial, Eichmann tried to cover up his lack of skills and education, and even "blushed" when these facts came to light. 
 Arendt confirms Eichmann and the heads of the Einsatzgruppen were part of an "intellectual elite." Unlike the Einsatzgruppen leaders, however, Eichmann would suffer from a “lack of imagination” and an "inability to think."
 Arendt confirms several points where Eichmann actually claimed he was responsible for certain atrocities, even though he lacked the power or expertise to take these actions. Moreover, Eichmann made these claims even though they hurt his defense, hence Arendt's remark that "Bragging was the vice that was Eichmann's undoing" (p. 46). Arendt also suggests that Eichmann may have preferred to be executed as a war criminal than live as a nobody. This parallels his overestimation of his own intelligence and his past value in the organizations in which he had served, as stated above.
 Arendt argues that Eichmann, in his peripheral role at the Wannsee Conference, witnessed the rank-and-file of the German civil service heartily endorse Reinhard Heydrich's program for the Final Solution of the Jewish question in Europe.  Upon seeing members of "respectable society" endorsing mass murder, and enthusiastically participating in the planning of the solution, Eichmann felt that his moral responsibility was relaxed, as if he were "Pontius Pilate".
 During his imprisonment before his trial, the Israeli government sent no fewer than six psychologists to examine Eichmann. These psychologists found no trace of mental illness, including personality disorder. One doctor remarked that his overall attitude towards other people, especially his family and friends, was "highly desirable", while another remarked that the only unusual trait Eichmann displayed was being more "normal" in his habits and speech than the average person (pp. 25–6).

Arendt suggests that this most strikingly discredits the idea that the Nazi criminals were manifestly psychopathic and different from "normal" people. From this document, many concluded that situations such as the Holocaust can make even the most ordinary of people commit horrendous crimes with the proper incentives, but Arendt adamantly disagreed with this interpretation, as Eichmann was voluntarily following the Führerprinzip. Arendt insists that moral choice remains even under totalitarianism, and that this choice has political consequences even when the chooser is politically powerless:

Arendt mentions, as a case in point, Denmark:

On Eichmann's personality, Arendt concludes:

Arendt ended the book by writing:

Legality of the trial 
Beyond her discussion of Eichmann himself, Arendt discusses several additional aspects of the trial, its context, and the Holocaust.
 She points out that Eichmann was kidnapped by Israeli agents in Argentina and transported to Israel, an illegal act, and that he was tried in Israel even though he was not accused of committing any crimes there.  "If he had not been found guilty before he appeared in Jerusalem, guilty beyond any reasonable doubt, the Israelis would never have dared, or wanted, to kidnap him in formal violation of Argentine law."
 She describes his trial as a show trial arranged and managed by Prime Minister Ben-Gurion, and says that Ben-Gurion wanted, for several political reasons, to emphasize not primarily what Eichmann had done, but what the Jews had suffered during the Holocaust. She points out that the war criminals tried at Nuremberg were "indicted for crimes against the members of various nations," without special reference to the Nazi genocide against the Jews.
 She questions Israel's right to try Eichmann. Israel was a signatory to the 1950 UN Genocide Convention, which rejected universal jurisdiction and required that defendants be tried 'in the territory of which the act was committed' or by an international tribunal. The court in Jerusalem did not pursue either option.
 Eichmann's deeds were not crimes under German law, as, at that time, in the eyes of the Third Reich, he was a law-abiding citizen. He was tried for 'crimes in retrospect'. 
 The prosecutor, Gideon Hausner, followed the tone set by Prime Minister Ben-Gurion, who stated, 'It is not an individual nor the Nazi regime on trial, but Antisemitism throughout history.' Hausner's corresponding opening statements, which heavily referenced biblical passages, was 'bad history and cheap rhetoric,' according to Arendt. Furthermore, it suggested that Eichmann was no criminal, but the 'innocent executor of some foreordained destiny.'

Banality of evil 
Arendt's book introduced the expression and concept of the banality of evil. Her thesis is that Eichmann was actually not a fanatic or a sociopath, but instead an extremely average and mundane person who relied on clichéd defenses rather than thinking for himself, was motivated by professional promotion rather than ideology, and believed in success which he considered the chief standard of "good society". Banality, in this sense, does not mean that Eichmann's actions were in any way ordinary, but that his actions were motivated by a sort of complacency which was wholly unexceptional. Many mid-20th century pundits were favorable to the concept.

Jewish alleged cooperation 
Another one of the most controversial points raised by Arendt in her book is her criticism concerning the alleged role of Jewish authorities in the Holocaust. In her writings, Arendt expressed her objections to the prosecution’s refusal to address the cooperation of the leaders of the Judenräte (the Jewish councils) with the Nazis. In the book, Arendt asserts that Jewish organizations and leaderships in Europe collaborated with the Nazis and were directly responsible for the numbers of Jewish victims reaching the dimensions they did:

Reception 
Eichmann in Jerusalem upon publication and in the years following was controversial. Arendt has long been accused of "blaming the victim" in the book. She responded to the initial criticism in a postscript to the book:

Stanley Milgram, who would conduct controversial experiments on obedience maintains that "Arendt became the object of considerable scorn, even calumny" because she highlighted Eichmann's "banality" and "normalcy", and accepted Eichmann's claim that he did not have evil intents or motives to commit such horrors; nor did he have a thought to the immorality and evil of his actions, or indeed, display, as the prosecution depicted, that he was a sadistic "monster".

Jacob Robinson published And the Crooked Shall be Made Straight, the first full-length rebuttal of her book. Robinson presented himself as an expert in international law, not saying that he was an assistant to the prosecutor in the case.

In his 2006 book, Becoming Eichmann: Rethinking the Life, Crimes and Trial of a "Desk Murderer", Holocaust researcher David Cesarani questioned Arendt's portrait of Eichmann on several grounds. According to his findings, Arendt attended only part of the trial, witnessing Eichmann's testimony for "at most four days" and basing her writings mostly on recordings and the trial transcript. Cesarani feels that this may have skewed her opinion of him, since it was in the parts of the trial that she missed that the more forceful aspects of his character appeared. Cesarani also suggested that Eichmann was in fact highly anti-Semitic and that these feelings were important motivators of his actions. Thus, he alleges that Arendt's claims that his motives were "banal" and non-ideological and that he had abdicated his autonomy of choice by obeying Hitler's orders without question may stand on weak foundations. This is a recurrent criticism of Arendt, though nowhere in her work does Arendt deny that Eichmann was an anti-Semite, and she also did not claim that Eichmann was "simply" following orders, but rather had internalized the rationalities of the Nazi regime.

Cesarani suggests that Arendt's own prejudices influenced the opinions she expressed during the trial. He argues that like many Jews of German origin, she held Ostjuden (Jews from Eastern Europe) in great disdain. This, according to Cesarani, led her to attack the conduct and efficacy of the chief prosecutor, Gideon Hausner, who was of Galician-Jewish origin. According to Cesarani, in a letter to the noted German philosopher Karl Jaspers she stated that Hausner was "a typical Galician Jew... constantly making mistakes. Probably one of those people who doesn't know any language."  Cesarani claims that some of her opinions of Jews of Middle Eastern origin verged on racism as she described the Israeli crowds in her letter to Karl Jaspers: "My first impression: On top, the judges, the best of German Jewry. Below them, the prosecuting attorneys, Galicians, but still Europeans. Everything is organized by a police force that gives me the creeps, speaks only Hebrew, and looks Arabic. Some downright brutal types among them. They would obey any order. And outside the doors, the Oriental mob, as if one were in Istanbul or some other half-Asiatic country. In addition, and very visible in Jerusalem, the peies [sidelocks] and caftan Jews, who make life impossible for all reasonable people here." Cesarani's book was itself criticized. In a review that appeared in The New York Times Book Review, Barry Gewen argued that Cesarani's hostility stemmed from his book standing "in the shadow of one of the great books of the last half-century", and that Cesarani's suggestion that both Arendt and Eichmann had much in common in their backgrounds, making it easier for her to look down on the proceedings, "reveals a writer in control neither of his material nor of himself."

Eichmann in Jerusalem, according to Hugh Trevor-Roper, is deeply indebted to Raul Hilberg's The Destruction of the European Jews, so much so that Hilberg himself spoke of plagiarism. The very points which Arendt borrows from Hilberg were borrowed by Hilberg himself from H. G. Adler.

Arendt also received criticism in the form of responses to her article, also published in the New Yorker. One instance of this came mere weeks after the publication of her articles in the form of an article entitled "Man With an Unspotted Conscience". This work was written by witness for the defense, Michael A. Musmanno. He argued that Arendt fell prey to her own preconceived notions that rendered her work ahistorical. He also directly criticized her for ignoring the facts offered at the trial in stating that "the disparity between what Miss Arendt states, and what the ascertained facts are, occurs with such a disturbing frequency in her book that it can hardly be accepted as an authoritative historical work." He further condemned Arendt and her work for her prejudices against Hauser and Ben-Gurion depicted in Eichmann in Jerusalem: A Report on the Banality of Evil. Musmanno argued that Arendt revealed "so frequently her own prejudices" that it could not stand as an accurate work.

Arendt relied heavily on the book by H.G. Adler Theresienstadt 1941-1945. The Face of a Coerced Community (Cambridge University Press. 2017), which she had read in manuscript. Adler took her to task on her view of Eichmann in his keynote essay "What does Hannah Arendt know about Eichmann and the Final Solution?" (Allgemeine Wochenzeitung der Juden in Deutschland. 20 November 1964).

In more recent years, Arendt has received further criticism from authors Bettina Stangneth and Deborah Lipstadt. Stangneth argues in her work, Eichmann Before Jerusalem, that Eichmann was, in fact, an insidious antisemite. She utilized the Sassen Papers and accounts of Eichmann while in Argentina to prove that he was proud of his position as a powerful Nazi and the murders that this allowed him to commit. While she acknowledges that the Sassen Papers were not disclosed in the lifetime of Arendt, she argues that the evidence was there at the trial to prove that Eichmann was an antisemitic murderer and that Arendt simply ignored this. Deborah Lipstadt contends in her work, The Eichmann Trial, that Arendt was too distracted by her own views of totalitarianism to objectively judge Eichmann. She refers to Arendt's own work on totalitarianism, The Origins of Totalitarianism, as a basis for Arendt's seeking to validate her own work by using Eichmann as an example.  Lipstadt further contends that Arendt "wanted the trial to explicate how these societies succeeded in getting others to do their atrocious biddings" and so framed her analysis in a way which would agree with this pursuit. However, Arendt has also been praised for being among the first to point out that intellectuals, such as Eichmann and other leaders of the Einsatzgruppen, were in fact more accepted in the Third Reich despite Nazi Germany's persistent use of anti-intellectual propaganda.  During a 2013 review of historian Christian Ingrao's book Believe and Destroy, which pointed out that Hitler was more accepting of intellectuals with German ancestry and that at least 80 German intellectuals assisted his "SS War Machine," Los Angeles Review of Books journalist Jan Mieszkowski praised Arendt for being "well aware that there was a place for the thinking man in the Third Reich."

See also 

 Little Eichmanns
 Moral disengagement
 Milgram experiment (obedience to authority, 1961)
 Stanford prison experiment (Zimbardo, 1972)
 Superior orders

References

Bibliography 

  Full text: 1964 edition 
 
 
 
 
 , Eichmann Interrogated (1982)  — a book referenced in Eichmann in Jerusalem which contains excerpts from Eichmann's pre-trial interrogation

External links 
 articles tagged Hannah Arendt  from The New Yorker
 Hannah Arendt Papers: Speeches and Writings File, 1923-1975  Library of Congress, Manuscript Division. Includes manuscript copy of Eichmann in Jerusalem.

1963 non-fiction books
Books by Hannah Arendt
Cultural depictions of Adolf Eichmann
History books about the Holocaust
Holocaust trials
Political books
Viking Press books
Works originally published in The New Yorker